The 2012 Città di Como Challenger was a professional tennis tournament played on clay courts. It was the seventh edition of the tournament which was part of the 2012 ATP Challenger Tour. It took place in Como, Italy between 27 August and 2 September 2012.

Singles main draw entrants

Seeds

 1 Rankings are as of August 20, 2012.

Other entrants
The following players received wildcards into the singles main draw:
  Andrea Arnaboldi
  Marco Cecchinato
  Marco Crugnola
  Nicolás Massú

The following players received entry as an alternate into the singles main draw:
  Michael Lammer
  Michael Linzer
  Stéphane Robert

The following players received entry from the qualifying draw:
  Andre Begemann
  Alberto Brizzi
  Evgeny Korolev
  Yann Marti

Champions

Singles

 Andreas Haider-Maurer def.  João Sousa, 6–3, 6–4

Doubles

 Philipp Marx /  Florin Mergea def.  Colin Ebelthite /  Jaroslav Pospíšil, 6–4, 4–6, [10–4]

External links
Official Website

Citta di Como Challenger
Città di Como Challenger
Città di Como Challenger
Città di Como Challenger
Città di Como Challenger